Francisco "Francis" Javier Solar González (born 14 September 1983) is a Spanish footballer who plays for Marbella FC as a goalkeeper.

Club career
Born in Málaga, Andalusia, Francis finished his graduation with local Málaga CF, and made his senior debuts with the B-team on 30 August 2003, in a 2–3 away loss against UD Almería in the Segunda División championship. He played in Segunda División B but also in Tercera División in the following years, representing Valencia CF Mestalla, CD Eldense, UD Juventud Barrio del Cristo (two stints), Ontinyent CF and CD Olímpic de Xàtiva; with the latter he achieved promotion from the fourth level in 2011, appearing in 27 matches.

On 22 June 2014, after four full seasons as an undisputed starter, Francis moved to fellow third division side CF Reus Deportiu. On 16 January of the following year, after being a backup to Édgar Badía, he joined Marbella FC in the same level.

References

External links
 
 Futbolme profile  
 

1983 births
Living people
Footballers from Málaga
Spanish footballers
Association football goalkeepers
Segunda División players
Segunda División B players
Tercera División players
Atlético Malagueño players
Valencia CF Mestalla footballers
CD Eldense footballers
Ontinyent CF players
CD Olímpic de Xàtiva footballers
CF Reus Deportiu players
Spain youth international footballers